Adrian Trevilyan (born 7 July 2001) is an Australian rugby league footballer who plays as a  for the Canberra Raiders in the NRL.

Background
Trevilyan was born in Townsville, Queensland. He attended Kirwan State High School before being signed by the Canberra Raiders.

Playing career
In 2019, Trevilyan played with Kirwan State High School in their NRL Schoolboy Cup final win over Westfields Sports High School. In October 2019, Trevilyan signed with the Canberra Raiders.

In 2020, Trevilyan was set to play for the Raiders' Jersey Flegg Cup team before the season was canceled due to the COVID-19 pandemic.

Trevilyan played the 2021 season in Canberra's NSW Cup team.

Trevilyan made his first grade debut in round 2 of the 2022 NRL season for Canberra against the North Queensland Cowboys.

References

External links
Canberra Raiders profile

2001 births
Living people
Australian rugby league players
Canberra Raiders players
Rugby league hookers
Rugby league players from Townsville